Dahmani, formerly Abbah Quşūr (alternative spellings Abbah Qusur or Ebba Ksour), is a town and commune in the Kef Governorate, Tunisia. As of 2004 it had a population of 14,061. It is located at 625 meters above sea level, 225 kilometers southwest of Tunis.

History
Near the village known today as Medeina, 9 km to the southwest, is the archaeological site of Althiburos an ancient numidian city, and former Roman town hall.

From 1941 on, it became a parish of the Roman Catholic Archdiocese of Tunis.  In 1943 it accommodated the American troops engaged in the combat on the African front during World War II.

Economy
Its main activity is agriculture, and in particular the production of wheat: it houses the largest wheat silos in central Tunisia. Dahmani is also known for its other resources:
 Quarries of stone, sand, marble and clay
 Sheepskins and wool
 Wood and forest plants
 Mineral and thermal water resources
 Mines of iron, phosphate and carbonate

Sport
The Dahmani Athletic Club is the football club of the city; it evolved during the 2010–2011 season in Ligue III.

Politics
Dahmani has a mayor. Recent mayors include:
 1970-1975: Abderrahim Zouari
 1980-2010: Hamadi Tebai
 2013-present: Mohamed Hédi Ben Madhi

Landmarks
 
The church of Ebba Ksour, located in the city of Dahmani (formerly Ebba Ksour), is a Catholic church built during the French protectorate. Ceded to the Tunisian government in 1964, it is now a dwelling house.
The Dahmani meteorite is a 18kg meteorite that fell in May 1981 in Tunisia. It was observed by villagers in the Dahmani region (Kef governorate) and recovered by French soldiers who went to the site and then handed over to the geological service of Tunis. The meteorite is listed by the Laboratory of Mineralogy-Crystallography, associated with the CNRS in Paris, the Laboratory of Mineralogy of the National Museum of Natural History of Paris and the famous Meteoritical Society.

Notable people
Slama Kasdaoui, Tunisian footballer
Fethia Khaïri, Tunisian actress
Aymen Soltani, Tunisian footballer
Abderrahim Zouari, Tunisian politician
Fawzia Zouari, Tounisian journalist

References

Populated places in Kef Governorate
Communes of Tunisia
Catholic titular sees in Africa
Tunisia geography articles needing translation from French Wikipedia